The Future Crayon is a rarities and B-sides compilation by British indie electronic band Broadcast, released on 21 August 2006 by Warp. It collects all the tracks released on singles, EPs and compilations from 1999 to 2003, with the exception of "Drums on Fire" (from Extended Play Two).  The iTunes version added a 1997 instrumental from an NME compilation tape, and "Stupido" (the bonus track on the Japanese release of Haha Sound).

Track listing

References

Broadcast (band) compilation albums
2006 compilation albums
Warp (record label) compilation albums